Andy González (born on January 1, 1951, in Manhattan New York) was a jazz double bassist of Puerto Rican descent recognized as was one of the innovators of Latin Jazz."González was a versatile player, as well as an arranger, composer, music historian and producer of other musicians’ records. He embraced African, Cuban and Puerto Rican styles, various strains of jazz and other influences, often merging them into something fresh."Raised in the Bronx, he played violin in grammar school and later picked up the bass after taking lessons with jazz bassist Steve Swallow from 5th to 8th grade, thereafter he attended the High School of Music & Art. "Swallow turned Gonzalez on to Pablo Casals and Scott Lafaro, wrote out the second movement of the Bach Cello Suite in D minor, and helped Gonzalez prepare for his audition at Music and Art." "Andy González came to the public's attention playing for future NEA Jazz Master Ray Barretto's band, while he was still a student at Music & Art High School. Although it was a salsa group in the Cuban conjunto trumpet tradition, Barretto treated the group like a jazz combo, featuring all the players as soloists." While at Music & Art High School, he "play[ed] with other classmates such as Mongo Santamaria's son, Monguito, Jose Mangual Jr., Rene Mcclean, Onaje Allen Gumbs, Stafford Osborne, Nelson Samafiego, a Puerto Rican alto saxophonist, DJ Cousin Brucie, Eric Bibb (son of Leo Bibb), Wilbur Bascomb(son of Ted Bascomb, bassist for Erskine Hawkins), Allison Dean, and Janis Ian, who was in his homeroom and dropped out sophomore year just after recording 'Society's Child.'

Career
In 1974 González and his brother Jerry González founded the band Conjunto Libre (a band that, mixed salsa and jazz) and Grupo Folklórico y Experímental Nuevayorquíno, with whom he produced three albums: Concepts in Unity (1975), Lo Dice Todo (1976), and Homenaje a Arsenio (2011). The band included Frankie Rodríguez, Milton Cardona, Gene Golden, Carlos Mestre, Nelson González, Manny Oquendo, Oscar Hernández, José Rodríguez, Néstor Torres, Gonzalo Fernández, Alfredo "Chocolate" Armenteros, Willy García, Heny Álvarez, Virgilio Martí, Marcelino Guerra, Rubén Blades, Orlando "Puntilla" Ríos, and Julito Collazo on the first two albums. The second group that Andy co-led was Manny Oquendo and Libre. In 1980, the third group González co-led was The Fort Apache band (named after a nickname for a Bronx police precinct house), with his brother Jerry González.   González also worked with Tito Puente, Eddie Palmieri, Ray Barreto, and Mongo Santamaria.

"González’s unique ability to play creatively within the confines of the tumbao — the repetitive patterns played by bass, piano, guitar, tres and cuatro in Cuban and Puerto Rican music — led him to be called for literally hundreds of recording sessions. But he was not limited to salsa-based dates, as he would be called upon by artists including David Byrne, Kip Hanrahan, Dizzy Gillespie and Astor Piazzolla for his expertise on both acoustic and baby bass."

In 2016, at the age of 65, Gonzalez released his first album under his own name and leadership, “Entre Colegas.”  The recording featured a tribute to the well-known Cuban bassist Israel Lopez “Cachao”. “Entre Colegas” was nominated for a grammy award for Best Latin Jazz album.

Death
González died from pneumonia and complications of diabetes in the Bronx on April 9, 2020.

Selected Discography

 Conjunto Egrem – Tu Dices / Solamente Tuyo (Egrem 1975)
 Concepts in Unity (1975) 
 Lo Dice Todo (1976) 
Michael Manring, Andy Gonzalez, Francis Rocco Prestia & Victor Wooten – Bass Day '98 (Hudson Music, 1999)
Bob Mintzer, Giovanni Hidalgo, Andy Gonzalez, David Chesky, Randy Brecker – The Body Acoustic (2004)
Michael Simon (6) Featuring Marlon Simon, Andy Gonzalez, Edward Simon – New York Encounter (Fresh Sound New Talent, 2009)
 Homenaje a Arsenio (2011)
Entre Colegas (Truth Revolution Records, 2016)

References

External links
 
Jerry González and Andy González Biography - (b. 1949 and 1951), conguero, bonguero, timbalero, conjunto, Ya Yo Me Curé - Jazz, Band, Musical, Music, Latin, and Oquendo

See also
 Salsa
 Charanga_(Cuba)
 Afro-Cuban jazz

1951 births
2020 deaths
Jazz musicians from New York (state)
Musicians from the Bronx
21st-century American male musicians
21st-century double-bassists
American jazz double-bassists
Male double-bassists
American male jazz musicians
Jazz fusion musicians
Avant-garde jazz musicians
American musicians of Puerto Rican descent
American salsa musicians